Belinda Chantalle Zijderveld (born 17 September 2000) is a retired Dutch swimmer.  She competed at the 2020 Summer Paralympics, in Women's 200 metre individual medley SM10, winning a gold medal; Women's 50 metre freestyle S10 and Women's 100 metre freestyle S10, winning silver medals; and Women's 100 metre butterfly S10, winning a bronze medal.

Personal history
Zijderveld was born in Zwijndrecht, Netherlands in 2000. She was born without a right hand.

International career
Zijderveld made her international debut in 2013, during the World Championships in Montréal. She competed in S10 classification freestyle events, but her specialty is the SB9 breaststroke, taking three European and two World titles in the 100m distance.

References

External links 
 

2000 births
Living people
Dutch female breaststroke swimmers
Dutch female butterfly swimmers
Dutch female freestyle swimmers
Dutch female medley swimmers
S10-classified Paralympic swimmers
Medalists at the World Para Swimming Championships
Medalists at the World Para Swimming European Championships
Sportspeople from Zwijndrecht, Netherlands
Paralympic medalists in swimming
Paralympic gold medalists for the Netherlands
Paralympic silver medalists for the Netherlands
Paralympic bronze medalists for the Netherlands
Medalists at the 2016 Summer Paralympics
Medalists at the 2020 Summer Paralympics
Swimmers at the 2016 Summer Paralympics
Swimmers at the 2020 Summer Paralympics
Paralympic swimmers of the Netherlands
21st-century Dutch women